Lindo is a surname. Notable people with the surname include:

 Abigail Lindo (1803–1848), British lexicographer
 Allan Lindo, more commonly known as apl.de.ap (born 1974), Filipino-American musician
 Dean Lindo (born 1932), Belizean attorney
 Delroy Lindo (born 1952), British-American actor 
 Earl Lindo (1953–2017), Jamaican reggae musician
 Elvira Lindo (born 1962), Spanish journalist and writer
 Henry Laurence Lindo, Jamaican civil servant
 Hugo Lindo (1917–1985), Salvadorian writer, diplomat, politician, and lawyer
 Ian Lindo (born 1983), Caymanian footballer
 Jimena Lindo (born 1976), Peruvian actress, dancer and TV presenter
 Juan Lindo (1790–1857), Conservative Central American politician
 José Alexandre Alves Lindo, (born 1973) Brazilian footballer
 Kashief Lindo (born c.1978), Jamaican reggae singer
 Laura Mae Lindo (born 1976), Canadian politician
 Mark Prager Lindo (1819—1877), Dutch prose writer 
 Matilde Lindo (1954–2013), Nicaraguan feminist and activist
 Olga Lindo (1899–1968), English actress
 Vincent Lindo (born 1936), English cricketer
 Percy Lindo, Jamaican industrialist and politician 
 The Lindo family

Other uses
 LINDO, software package for optimization applications
 Lindö, locality in Östergötland County, Sweden 
 Lindö FF, Swedish football club
 Lindø RSC, Danish rugby club

See also
 Lindau (disambiguation)
 Lindokuhle

References